Rocco Sollecito (June 9, 1948 – May 27, 2016) was an Italian-Canadian underboss of the Rizzuto crime family based in Montreal, Quebec, Canada.

Biography
Sollecito was born in Bari, Italy. Sollecito was believed to be one of the "top five figures" within the Rizzuto family and was responsible for deals within the construction industry. He was arrested on November 22, 2006, along with dozens of others including Nicolo Rizzuto, Paolo Renda, Francesco Arcadi, Lorenzo Giordano and Francesco Del Balso, as part of Project Colisée. 

Sollecito pled guilty in September 2008 to "general conspiracy to commit extortion, bookmaking, illegal gaming as well as being in possession of the proceeds of crime" and was sentenced to eight years imprisonment, though he was released in the summer of 2011. His son, Stefano, and Vito Rizzuto's son, Leonardo, are believed to be the heads of the Mafia in Montreal, who were both arrested and charged with drug trafficking and gangsterism in November 2015. On February 19, 2018, they were released from prison, acquitted of charges of gangsterism and conspiracy to traffic cocaine.

Death
Sollecito was shot to death in Laval around 08:30 ET on May 27, 2016, while driving a white BMW SUV. He was 67 years old at the time of his death. 

Sollecito's death is believed to be part of dismantling the older generation of the Rizzuto family. Sollecito's death occurred just months after the death of Rizzuto confidant, Lorenzo "Skunk" Giordano, who was shot to death in a parking lot in Laval.

On October 17, 2019, Jonathan Massari, Dominico Scarfo, Guy Dion and Marie-Josée Viau, were arrested and charged with planning and executing the murders of Sollecito and Giordano.

References

1948 births
2016 deaths
Canadian gangsters of Italian descent
Italian gangsters
Italian emigrants to Canada
People from Bari
Rizzuto crime family
Murdered Mafiosi
Organized crime in Montreal
Murdered Canadian gangsters
Canadian prisoners and detainees
Prisoners and detainees of Canada
Deaths by firearm in Quebec
People murdered in Quebec